Seogeochado, Seogeocha Island, or West Geocha Island, is a  island west of Donggeochado in the Geocha Archipelago in South Korea. It is part of the Dadohaehaesang National Park, and constitutes the north-western point of the Maenggol Channel. Administratively it is located in the western part of Jindo County, South Jeolla Province, in the administrative division of Seogeochado-ri, Jodo-myeon.

In April 2014, the passenger ferry MV Sewol  capsized north of the nearby island Byeongpungdo, and sank off the coast of Donggeochado.

References

External links 
 

Jindo County
Islands of South Jeolla Province
Islands of the Yellow Sea